Huduthi Nagasandra commonly known as H. Nagasandra is a village in the southern state of Karnataka, India. It is located in the Gauribidanur taluk of Chikkaballapura district in Karnataka. It is situated 7 km away from sub-district headquarter Gauribidanur and 42 km away from district headquarter Chikkaballapura.

Demographics
According to Census 2011 information the location code or village code of H. Nagasandra village is 623247. H. Nagasandra belongs to Doddakurugodu Gram Panchayat.

The total geographical area of village is 742.5 hectares. H. Nagasandra has a total population of 3,189 peoples with 1,624 males and 1,565 females. There are about 720 houses in H. Nagasandra village. Gauribidanur is nearest town to H. Nagasandra which is approximately 7 km away.

Economy
People belonging to the H. Nagasandra village grow very much maize, millet silk, etc. The major occupations of the residents of H. Nagasandra are dairy farming. The dairy cooperative is the largest individual milk supplying cooperative in the state.

Facilities
H. Nagasandra has below types of facilities.

 Anganawadi Center
 Government higher primary School
 H. Nagasandra KMF (Karnataka Milk Federation) Dairy
 Post Office

Temples 
 Bharatha Matha temple
 sri Shanimahathma Swami Temple
 Universal Good News Church

Notable people
 N. H. Shivashankara Reddy - Indian politician who is a Member of the Karnataka Legislative Assembly from the INC for Gauribidanur Taluk.

See also
 B. Bommasandra, Gauribidanur

References

External links
 https://chikkaballapur.nic.in/en/

Villages in Chikkaballapur district